Bill Kramer (born January 21, 1965) is an American attorney, businessman, and former politician.  A Republican, he was a member of the Wisconsin State Assembly for 8 years and was majority leader from September 2013 to March 2014, when he was forced to quit the leadership due to sexual misconduct charges.

Career
Born in Waukesha, Wisconsin, Kramer graduated from Waukesha South High School, He then graduated from University of Wisconsin–Whitewater with a degree in accounting and received his J.D. degree from Duke University. Kramer is the owner of an accounting business and has served in the Wisconsin State Assembly since 2007 as a Republican. In 2013, the Republican members of the Wisconsin Assembly named Kramer majority leader of the Wisconsin Assembly, replacing Scott Suder, who resigned.

Sexual assault allegations and conviction
Kramer was removed from this position on March 4, 2014, following several allegations of sexual harassment. He was arrested in March 2014 after a GOP staffer accused him of sexual assault. She alleged that Kramer had grabbed her breasts and groin after a Republican event at a bar in Muskego on April 8, 2011. Kramer pleaded not guilty to those charges.

Kramer was sentenced to five months in jail, after pleading no contest to two charges of sexual assault with three years probation and was stripped of his Majority Leader status. He was allowed to finish out his term, but did not seek re-election.

References

External links
 
 

 

 

Politicians from Waukesha, Wisconsin
University of Wisconsin–Whitewater alumni
Duke University School of Law alumni
Republican Party members of the Wisconsin State Assembly
American people convicted of sexual assault
Businesspeople from Wisconsin
Wisconsin lawyers
1965 births
Living people
American politicians convicted of sex offences
Wisconsin politicians convicted of crimes
21st-century American politicians